Sulejman Demollari (born 15 May 1964 in Tirana) also known as Sul Demollari is an Albanian former football player and coach.

Playing career

Early life
Demollari was born in Albania's capital Tirana, where he was raised as a child and where he completed his primary education. He studied at the Qemal Stafa High School, in Tirana, Albania. From a young age he was part of 'KF Vojo Kushi', which was a sports institution. Despite still being in school, Demollari had impressed many football specialists and was quickly picked to play for Dinamo Tirana's youth team where he managed to become one of the best players on the team. At the age of just 15 he was called up to play for Dinamo's senior team, alongside fellow midfield legends such as Ilir Përnaska, Shyqyri Ballgjini and Muhedin Targaj.

Club
Demollari played his entire career in Albania for Dinamo Tirana, alongside fellow internationals Genc Ibro, Eduard Abazi and Agim Canaj, winning two league titles.  

Following the fall of communism, Demollari was among the first players to pursue a career abroad, signing for Romanian side Dinamo București in 1991. He was wanted at Dinamo by coach Florin Halagian who saw him in a Albania U21 – West Germany U21 1–1. Demollari made his Divizia A debut on 25 August 1991 in a 6–0 victory against Petrolul Ploiești in which he scored two goals and gave an assist. In his first season spent at the club, Demollari scored 18 goals in 30 league games, being the team's second top scorer after Gábor Gerstenmájer, helping Dinamo win the title undefeated, also scoring the only goal in a 1–0 victory in a derby against Steaua București. Demollari appeared in a total of 100 Divizia A matches in which he scored 36 goals and received only one yellow card, also he is considered one of the best foreign footballers that played in Romania. 

Demollari spent the last years of his career, having short spells in Greece with Panionios and in Hungary with Győr. He played a total of 25 games, scoring three goals in European competitions, including appearing in Dinamo București's 2–1 victory on aggregate against Luis Figo's Sporting Lisabona in the 1991–92 UEFA Cup.

International
Sulejman Demollari was part of Albania U21's generation that finished the qualification group on the 1st position in front of West Germany U21 at the 1984 UEFA European Under-21 Championship where in the quarter-finals they were eliminated by Italy U21 after a double 1–0 loss.

Demollari played 45 matches and scored one goal at international level for Albania, making his debut on 27 April 1983 under coach Shyqyri Rreli in a Euro 1984 qualification match which ended with a 1–0 loss against Northern Ireland. He played six games at the 1986 World Cup qualifiers, including a 2–0 victory against Belgium. Demollari went on to play six games at the Euro 1988 qualifiers, six games at the 1990 World Cup qualifiers, five at the Euro 1992 qualifiers, nine matches in which he scored his only goal for the national team in a 3–1 loss against Lithuania at the 1994 World Cup qualifiers and nine games at the Euro 1996 qualifiers. From his 45 caps, only three were friendlies, in 41 he was in the starting 11 and he was captain in 18 matches.

International goals
Scores and results list Albania's goal tally first, score column indicates score after each Demollari goal.

Managerial career
In 2001, Demollari started his coaching career at Albania's national team having a total of 9 games (1 victory, 3 draws, 5 losses), including two at the 2002 World Cup qualifiers. He also coached his former club, Dinamo Tirana.

From 2011 until 2012 Demollari worked as a scout for Dinamo București, bringing Elis Bakaj at the club.

Honours

Club
Dinamo Tirana
Kategoria Superiore: 1985–86, 1989–90
Kupa e Shqipërisë: 1985–86, 1989–90
Superkupa së Shqipërisë: 1990
Dinamo București
Divizia A: 1991–92

Individual
Sporti Popullor player of the season (6) – 1983, 1985, 1991, 1992, 1993, 1994
Mjeshtër i Merituar i Sportit (Deserved Master of Sport)
Nderi i Sportit Shqiptar (Honour of Albanian Sport)
Captain of Albania Senior, U-21 and youth national teams

References

External links

1964 births
Living people
Footballers from Tirana
Albanian footballers
Association football midfielders
Albania under-21 international footballers
Albania international footballers
FK Dinamo Tirana players
FC Dinamo București players
Panionios F.C. players
Győri ETO FC players
Albanian expatriate footballers
Expatriate footballers in Romania
Albanian expatriate sportspeople in Romania
Expatriate footballers in Greece
Albanian expatriate sportspeople in Greece
Expatriate footballers in Hungary
Albanian expatriate sportspeople in Hungary
Liga I players
Super League Greece players
Nemzeti Bajnokság I players
Albanian football managers
Albania national football team managers
KS Lushnja managers
Shkumbini Peqin managers
FK Dinamo Tirana managers
Qemal Stafa High School alumni